Avraham "Avi" Strul (or Strool, ; born 18 September 1980) is a retired Israeli footballer who currently works as the CEO of Hapoel Rishon LeZion.

Early life
Strul was born in Tel Aviv, Israel, to a Jewish family.

Being of Romanian-Jewish descent, Strul has two passports, Israeli and Romanian.

Career
Strul grew up in the youth system of Maccabi Tel Aviv and spent 7 years there. During the summer of 2006 he transferred to Maccabi Netanya. After 2 successful years in Maccabi Netanya, Strool moved to Lokeren for a 3 years contract worth $750,000.

KSC Lokeren
In just his second game at Lokeren, Strul scored a memorable goal against A.F.C. Tubize, when he scored the second goal of the match, capitalising on a goalkeeper mistake to take a free-kick quickly and score from long range.

Maccabi Tel Aviv
In June 2010 Strul signed a 3-year contract with his youth club Maccabi Tel Aviv which he left 4 years before.

References

Honours
Israeli Premier League (2):
2002–03, 2012–13
State Cup (3):
2001, 2002, 2005

1980 births
Living people
Israeli Jews
Israeli footballers
Israel international footballers
Maccabi Tel Aviv F.C. players
Maccabi Netanya F.C. players
K.S.C. Lokeren Oost-Vlaanderen players
Hapoel Nir Ramat HaSharon F.C. players
Hapoel Rishon LeZion F.C. players
Israeli expatriate footballers
Israeli expatriate sportspeople in Belgium
Belgian Pro League players
Israeli Premier League players
Liga Leumit players
Footballers from Tel Aviv
Israeli people of Romanian-Jewish descent
Association football defenders